The Asia Swimming Federation (AASF) oversees international aquatics competitions in Asia, and is affiliated to the Olympic Council of Asia and to FINA. It was founded in 1978 in Bangkok; and currently has its administrative headquarters in Muscat, Oman.

As of August 2009, the AASF President is Sheikh Khalid Mohammed Al Badr Al Sabah of Kuwait.

Members

Competitions
Swimming: Asian Swimming Championships
Aquatics: Asian Age Group Championships
Diving: Asian Diving Cup
Water Polo: Asian Water Polo Championship, Asian Water Polo Cup, Asian Water Polo Clubs Championships, Asian Junior Water Polo Championship
Open Water: Asian Open Water Championships
Asian Schools Championships

References

External links
AASF web site

National members of FINA
Swimming organizations
 
Sports governing bodies in Asia
Sports organizations established in 1978